Ümit Nazlı Boyner (née Alpay; born 28 September 1963) is a Turkish businesswoman who served as the 14th President of the Turkish Industry and Business Association (TÜSİAD) from 2010 to 2013.

She is one of the co-founders of the Women Entrepreneurs Association of Turkey.

References

External links 

1963 births
Living people
Turkish women in business
Turkish businesspeople
University of Rochester alumni